Kim Se-ah is a South Korean actress and model. She is known for roles in dramas such as Seoul 1945, Janghwa Hongryeon jeon and Who Are You: School 2015.

Personal life
She is married to Kim Kyu-sik who is a cellist. They got married in 2009 and have two children, a son and daughter. In 2010, she published a book called The Naturalistic Childbirth of Kim Se-ah.

Filmography

Television series

Film

Books
 The Naturalistic Childbirth of Kim Se-ah.

References

External links 
 
 

1974 births
Living people
21st-century South Korean actresses
South Korean female models
South Korean television actresses
South Korean film actresses